Patricia Liu is an actress.

Career 
In 1997, Liu was a beauty pageant finalist of Miss Hong Kong 1997 without winning any award. 

Liu became an actress and joined TVB. Liu first received wide attention as host of The Rhino Club, and she is amongst the last to host TVB's K-100. Her TV dramas include War and Beauty and When Rules Turn Loose (2005).

Patricia joined ATV in 2006. She was at the 49th ATV anniversary aired on 27 May 2006 and also appeared in the audience along with all ATV actors watching the ATV The 12th Annual Most Popular TV Commercial Awards aired 22 April 2006.

At the start of 2008, Patricia left ATV and is now residing in Los Angeles for personal reasons. She has been in a few commercials, ads and short films in the short time she has been in the United States.

Filmography

Television series (TVB) 
 A Kindred Spirit (1999)
 Anti-Crime Squad (1999)
 Police Station No.7 (1999)
 Epic drama (1999)
 At the Threshold of an Era (2000)
 Healing Hands II (2000)
 Reaching Out (2000)
 Lost in Love (2000)
 FM701 (2000)
 Ups and Downs (2000)
 Legal Entanglement (2001)
 Invisible Journey (2001)
 The Trust of a Lifetime (2001)
 Golden Faith (2001)
 Street Fighters (2002)
 Armed Reaction II (2002)
 Find the Light (2003)
 Hearts of Fencing (2003)
 Greed Mask (2003)
 Hard Fate (2004)
 To Catch the Uncatchable (2004)
 Hidden Treasures (2004)
 Sunshine Heartbeat (2004)
 War and Beauty (2004)
 When Rules Turn Loose (2005)
 Trimming Success (2006)
 CIB Files (2006)
 Forensic Heroes (2006)
 Devil's Disciples (2007)

Television series (ATV) 
 Walled Village (2006)
 Relentless Justice (aka No Turning Back) (2006)
 The Men of Justice (2010)

Films 
 2006 Undying Love
 2007 Kung Fu Mahjong 3
 2010 Take Her Picture - as Ling. Short film.
 2011 The Scarlet Worm - as Molly.
 2014 Pretty Rosebud'' - as Mei Li.

TV shows 
Mark Six (1998–2000) (TVB)
City Focus (1998–2000) (TVB)
Culture Plaza (1998–2001) (TVB)
Rhino Club 1 & 2 (2001) (TVB)
Travel Catalog (2002) (TVB)
Music Programs (2002–2003) (TVB)
K-100 (2003–2005) (TVB)
Police Magazine (2004–2006) (RTHK)
DNA (2006) (ATV)
My Studio (2007) (ATV)

References

External links
Patricia Liu's blog at Alive not Dead

Living people
Hong Kong film actresses
Hong Kong television actresses
People from Los Angeles
TVB actors
20th-century Chinese actresses
21st-century Chinese actresses
Year of birth missing (living people)